Jishu Dasgupta (3 September 1956 – 21 December 2012) was an Indian Bengali television director and actor. After suffering from cancer for nine months, he died on 21 December 2012 in a hospital in Kolkata.

Works

Television  
 Director
 "Bhorer Khub kache"
 Balika Badhu
 "Utsaber Ratri
 "Ekon Shakal"
 Chuni-Panna
 De Re
 Kuasha Jakhon
 Manush
 Naachbe Radha
 Nana Ranger Din
 Tithir Atithi
 Sishirer Shabdo
'' Actor
 Abhinoy Noy (1983)
 Adalat O Ekti Meye'' (1982)

References 

1956 births
2012 deaths
Indian television directors
Male actors in Bengali cinema
Deaths from cancer in India